Étienne Doirat (c. 1675-1732) was a French furniture designer.

Early life
Étienne Doirat was born circa 1675. His family had been ébénistes in Paris since the early 1600s.

Career

Doirat designed "commodes, armoires, corner cupboards, and tables" as well as sideboards, writing desks, etc. He used exotic wood like amaranth, mahogany, olivetree wood, lemontree wood, rosewood, ebony, etc.

Doirat stamped his name to his furniture at a time when it was not the proper way. Indeed, furniture design guilds only allowed it was late as 1743.

In 1731, only one year before his death, he opened a store on the Rue Saint-Honoré in the 1st arrondissement of Paris.

One of his commodes can be seen at the J. Paul Getty Museum in Los Angeles, California.

Personal life
He married Marguerite Borel in 1704. They had seven children.

Death
He died in 1732.

References

1732 deaths
Furniture designers from Paris
Year of birth uncertain